Physocephalini  is a tribe of fly from the family Conopidae.

Genera 
Genus Physocephala Schiner, 1861
 Genus Physoconops  Szilady, 1926

References 

Parasitic flies
Conopidae
Brachycera tribes